Xenofon Verykios (Greek: Ξενοφών Βερύκιος, born 1951) is a Greek poet, and a professor in chemical mechanics at the University of Patras.

The professor is the member of the Administrative Committee of TEI of the Ionian Islands and benefactor, he does reports and has benefits on an innovator at the production of electrical energy from biomatic uses as the first glass experiment.  He made several proceedings that succeeded the ciphered dirt emission  He is also the president of the Poetic Symposium and member of many unions and councils with his benefits.

He received a B.S. in chemical engineering from Bucknell University in 1975. He received an M.S. in 1977 and a Ph.D in 1979 from Lehigh University.

Books

References

 

1951 births
Living people
Greek poets
Greek inventors
Poets from Achaea
People from Achaea
Academic staff of the University of Patras
Bucknell University alumni
Lehigh University alumni
Place of birth missing (living people)